Billie Bird Sellen (February 28, 1908 – November 27, 2002), better known professionally as Billie Bird, was an American actress and comedian. She played Margie in Dear John (1988–1992).

Early life
Born in Pocatello, Idaho, Bird was discovered at the age of eight while living at an orphanage. As a child, she worked in vaudeville, including the act known as the King Sisters, and later in theater/cabaret before moving on to television and films.

Career
She is credited with an appearance in a 1921 film Grass Widowers, but it is not clear if this is accurate. Otherwise, she broke into films in 1950, later making a brief, uncredited appearance in The Odd Couple as a chambermaid. Her only line was "Goodnight", which was said to Felix Ungar, who responded, "Goodbye." Bird often was cast by director John Hughes and appeared in many of his 1980 and 1990s films, such as Sixteen Candles, Home Alone, and Dennis the Menace, the latter two of which both paired her with veteran Hughes actor Bill Erwin playing her husband. She also starred as Mrs. Lois Feldman in Police Academy 4. Her last film appearance was in 1995's Jury Duty, with Pauly Shore.

In addition to films, Bird made numerous appearances on various television series, including roles on Happy Days, Silver Spoons, Ironside, Eight Is Enough, The Facts of Life, Who's the Boss?, and Knots Landing. She was also a regular cast member on the sitcoms It Takes Two in 1982, Benson from 1984 to 1986, and in 1988 Dear John starring Judd Hirsch. Her last acting role was a brief appearance in 1997 on an episode of the sitcom George and Leo, which starred Bob Newhart and Bird's former co-star, Hirsch.

Bird entertained troops in Vietnam with her own variety act, "Flying High With Billie Bird."  For her efforts, she was one of the few women to ever be made an honorary member of the Green Berets.

Personal life and death
Bird was married to Edwin Sellen until his death in 1966; they had three children.

Bird died on November 27, 2002, in Granada Hills, California, at the age of 94 after several years of Alzheimer's disease. She is buried in the Forest Lawn Memorial Park Cemetery in Glendale, California.

Filmography

References

External links

 
 
 

Actresses from Idaho
American women comedians
American film actresses
American television actresses
Burials at Forest Lawn Memorial Park (Glendale)
Deaths from Alzheimer's disease
Deaths from dementia in California
People from Pocatello, Idaho
People from Granada Hills, Los Angeles
Vaudeville performers
1908 births
2002 deaths
20th-century American actresses
Comedians from Idaho
Comedians from California
20th-century American comedians